Kara-Köl (Kara-Kulʼ) is a city in Jalal-Abad Region of Kyrgyzstan. It is a city of regional significance, not part of a district. Kara-Köl consists of the town proper, the urban-type settlement Ketmen-Töbö and the village Jazy-Kechüü.

Located on the river Naryn, downstream (southwest) of the Toktogul Dam, the city was built in the 1960s to house the construction workers for the dam, and granted city status in 1977. Currently, it is home to the staff of the hydroelectric plant. From the reservoir to Tash-Kömür the river flows through a gorge with a series of dams (the 'Lower Naryn Cascade').

The city is on the M41, near the Bishkek-Osh highway.

Population

References
 

Populated places in Jalal-Abad Region